Dennis Brickley (9 September 1929 – 12 June 1983) was an English professional footballer who made 169 appearances in the Football League playing on the right wing for Bradford Park Avenue. He was on the books of Huddersfield Town without playing for their first team.

References

1929 births
1983 deaths
Footballers from Bradford
English footballers
Association football wingers
Huddersfield Town A.F.C. players
Bradford (Park Avenue) A.F.C. players
English Football League players